Chilhowee Mountain is the name of two non-contiguous low ridges in the U.S. state of Tennessee. The northern section is at the outer edge of the Great Smoky Mountains, stretching between the Little Tennessee River and Chilhowee Dam to the west, and the Little Pigeon River watershed to the east. The southern section is within the outer edge of the Unicoi Mountains in Polk County. While not entirely within the Great Smoky Mountains National Park, the northernmost mountain's crest is traversed by the westernmost section of the Foothills Parkway.

Background
Little River cuts a large gap in the middle of the mountain (near Walland), dividing it into eastern and western sections.

The Ocoee River passes along its southern base, along with the Ocoee Scenic Byway, part of U.S. Route 64. The mountain is separated from Oswald Dome to the north by a saddle, although both are technically part of the same ridge. The mountain is accessible from US 64 via a paved forest service road, which contains multiple overlooks. A campground with an artificial lake, operated by the Forest Service, is located atop the mountain. Benton Falls is a waterfall on the eastern escarpment of the mountain, and is accessible via a trail that begins at the campground.

Name 
Chilhowee Mountain derives its name from Chilhowee, a Cherokee village in the 18th century. The etymology of the Cherokee name is unclear, and may be derived from the Muscogean name Chalahume, an earlier Creek name for the village. In English it has also been written "Chilhoe".

See also
English Mountain, also on the western edges of the Great Smoky Mountains
Cades Cove, a nearby visitor attraction

Bibliography

References

External links
 
 

Ridges of Tennessee
Great Smoky Mountains
Mountains of Great Smoky Mountains National Park
Mountains of Blount County, Tennessee
Landforms of Polk County, Tennessee